These are the results of the women's 52 kg (also known as half lightweight) competition in judo at the 1996 Summer Olympics in Atlanta, Georgia.  A total of 21 women competed in this event, limited to jūdōka whose body weight was less than, or equal to, 61 kilograms.  Competition took place on July 23 of 1996 in the Georgia World Congress Center.

Results
The gold and silver medalists were determined by the final match of the main single-elimination bracket.

Repechage
The losing semifinalists as well as those judoka eliminated in earlier rounds by the four semifinalists of the main bracket advanced to the repechage.  These matches determined the two bronze medalists for the event.

References

External links
 

W52
Judo at the Summer Olympics Women's Half Lightweight
Olympics W52
Judo